North Stoke  is a village in the Horsham District of West Sussex, England.

The village is on a spur of slightly higher ground on the east bank of a loop of the River Arun, surrounded by water meadows. It is in the middle of the gap eroded through the South Downs by the River Arun. A suspension bridge on the path was rebuilt by British Army Gurkhas in 2009 after being damaged by a falling tree.

Manor
North Stoke is a medieval village, recorded in the Domesday Book of 1086. It has lost most of its population, possibly due to Black Death in the Middle Ages or because the landowner preferred to enclose the land for sheep pasture. This has left a notable example of a Norman and Early English Gothic church, which is Listed Grade I.

Parish church

The Church of England parish church of the Virgin Mary is now redundant and maintained by the Churches Conservation Trust. The church's dedication had been long forgotten but in 2007 it was rediscovered from a scrap of a vellum letter dated 1275 from Stephen Bersted, Bishop of Chichester to Edward I. The church was accordingly rededicated to the Virgin Mary in December 2007.

References

Further reading

Horsham District
Villages in West Sussex